Chinsali District with headquarters at Chinsali is located in Muchinga Province, Zambia.

It lies on the watershed between the Chambeshi River in the Congo Basin and the Luangwa River in the Zambezi basin. The north-eastern half of the district is relatively flat plateau, especially along the Chambeshi, of 1200–1300 m elevation but the south-western half has an attractive landscape of granite hills with an elevation of 1500–1600 m, where the country estate of Shiwa Ngandu is located.

Despite running along the edge of the upper Luangwa Valley, there is no road (Matumbo/Chama Road) access from the district to that valley and its national parks except with specially-licensed off-road tour companies.

As of the 2000 Zambian Census, the district had a population of 128,646 people.

References

Districts of Muchinga Province